Qarehi (also Romanized as Qareh’ī; also known as Qarā’ī) is a village in Qaleh Juq Rural District, Anguran District, Mahneshan County, Zanjan Province, Iran. At the 2006 census, its population was 119, in 22 families.

References 

Populated places in Mahneshan County